Yuxarı Quşçular is a village de jure in the Shusha District of Azerbaijan, but under de facto control of the self-proclaimed Republic of Artsakh.

References 

Populated places in Shusha District